Lilla Varholmen is an island in Gothenburg's northern archipelago. The island is attached to Hisingen via a bridge and a car ferry service to Öckerö and Björkö is operated from here.
The first lighthouse was established in 1889. The current lighthouse is from 1927.

Islands on the Swedish West Coast
Islands of Västra Götaland County